Gestonorone acetate, or gestronol acetate, also known as norhydroxyprogesterone acetate, is a progestin of the 19-norprogesterone and 17α-hydroxyprogesterone groups which was developed in the early 1960s but was never marketed. It is the C17α acetate ester of gestronol (17α-hydroxy-19-norprogesterone).

Gestonorone acetate has been found to consistently inhibit ovulation at an oral dosage of 10 mg/day in combination with 50 μg/day oral ethinylestradiol. Weak or no endometrial effects were observed at an oral dosage of 100 mg/day, basal vacuoles appeared at 130 to 140 mg/day, and full endometrial secretory transformation occurred at 220 mg/day.

See also
 Gestonorone caproate

References

Abandoned drugs
Acetate esters
Diketones
Norpregnanes
Progestogen esters
Progestogens